Original Signal Recordings is an American independent record label based in New York City. Original Signal is owned and operated by Music Nation, distributed by Universal Motown Republic Group, and is a member of the American Association of Independent Music. Original Signal was founded in 2007 by CEO Daniel Klaus and President Lucas Mann. Mann was named to Billboard magazine's fourth annual "30 Under 30"  Power Players list.

Original Signal participates in full-service record deals with Athlete, The Bronx, David Ford, Kill Hannah, Longwave, The Modern Society, The Sounds, Lane Turner, and Butch Walker. Original Signal acts as the distribution and marketing arm for Ingrid Michaelson and her Cabin 24 Records.

Past
 Athlete
 The Bronx
 David Ford
 Kill Hannah
 Bad Lieutenant
 Longwave
 Ingrid Michaelson
 The Modern Society
 The Sounds
 Lane Turner
 Blanche
 Butch Walker
 The Futurecast
 Lindsey Ray
 Vega4

References

American independent record labels
Indie rock record labels